Athletics at the 2024 Summer Paralympics will be held at Stade de France in Paris. There will be 164 events: 90 for men, 73 for women and one mixed event, three fewer men's events than the previous Games while the women's and mixed events remain the same. It will be the largest contest of the Games programme regarding athlete numbers and medal events to be scheduled.

Classification and events

Participating athletes are given a classification depending on their disabilities (T denotes track events, F denotes field events). They are categorised into seven different classifications:

T/F11-13: Blind (11) and visually impaired (12-13) athletes; track athletes would often run with a guide.
T/F20: Athletes who have an intellectual impairment.
T/F 31-38: Athletes who have cerebral palsy or other coordination impairments. 31-34 for wheelchair events and 35-38 for running events.
F40-41: Les Autres - typically for athletes who have dwarfism.
T/F 42-47: Athletes who are amputees. In field events, some athletes would compete in seated events.
T/F 51-58: Athletes who have a spinal cord injury or disability. In field events, most athletes would compete in seated events.
T/F 61-64: Athletes who have a prosthesis affected by limb deficiency and leg length difference.

Qualification

Participating nations
 Host nation

Medal table

See also
Athletics at the 2024 Summer Olympics

References

2024 Summer Paralympics events
Athletics at the Summer Paralympics
2024 in athletics (track and field)
International athletics competitions hosted by France